Raymond Lombard (4 October 1918 – 5 July 2016) was a Belgian equestrian. He competed in two events at the 1956 Summer Olympics.

References

External links
 

1918 births
2016 deaths
Belgian male equestrians
Olympic equestrians of Belgium
Equestrians at the 1956 Summer Olympics
Sportspeople from Liège